Maria Elena Camerin and Émilie Loit were the defending champions, but Loit did not compete this year.

Camerin teamed up with Emmanuelle Gagliardi and reached the final against Victoria Azarenka and Tatiana Poutchek. However, Camerin suffered a sprain in her right ankle and was unable to play.

Seeds

Draw

Draw

References
ITF tournament profile
Main and Qualifying Rounds (WTA)

Tashkent Open - Doubles
2006 Tashkent Open